Bathymodiolus platifrons, described by Hashimoto and Okutani in 1994, is a deep-sea mussel that is common in hydrothermal vents and methane seeps in the Western Pacific Ocean.

Symbiosis
Bathymodiolus platifrons harbours methane-oxidizing bacteria in its gill, which help to transfer methane into material and energy to help it to thrive in such environments.

References

platifrons
Molluscs described in 1994
Chemosynthetic symbiosis